The Alaska Peninsula brown bear (Ursus arctos gyas) or "peninsular grizzly" is a colloquial nomenclature for a brown bear that lives in the coastal regions of southern Alaska. It may be a population of the mainland grizzly bear subspecies (Ursus arctos horribilis).

They are found in high densities along the southern Alaskan coast due not only to the large amount of clams and sedge grass but also to the annual salmon runs; this allows them to attain huge sizes, some of the biggest in the world. They may gather in large numbers at feeding sites, such as Brooks Falls and McNeil Falls, both in Katmai National Park near King Salmon.
Biologists maintain that coastal ones are truly brown bears. However, it is considered correct to place all North American members of U. arctos in the subspecies horribilis except the giant Kodiak bears of Kodiak Island. To avoid confusion, many simply refer to all North American members, including Kodiaks, as "brown bears".

Prized by hunters for their skulls and hides, up to 500 of Alaska's 1,500 brown bears killed yearly by hunters come from the Alaska Peninsula. To hunt this large bear, hunters must follow a variety of regulations, including bear bag limits, hunting fees and proper rifles.

Naming and etymology

The Alaska Peninsula brown bear's name most likely arose because, until 1975, it was considered a different species from the inland grizzly bear. It was never considered closer to European brown bears than inland grizzlies, but was given a different name, due to the size and color differences of coastal brown bears and inland grizzlies. From 1975 onward, it was considered to be the same species, but coastal ones retained the name "brown bear".
When mentioning Brown bears or Grizzly bears, they are the same animal living in different areas.
Coastal bears tend to be larger because of a diet high in salmon.
The total number of brown bears in the U.S. is estimated at 32,000 with approximately 95% (30,400) living in Alaska. Around 4000 of these are coastal bears.

Appearance
Alaska Peninsula brown bears are among the largest types of brown bear in the world. One of the tallest Alaskan brown bears was measured at 2.74 m tall. The biggest individual on record was shot in 1948 near Cold Bay. Although variable from blonde to nearly black, grizzly bear fur is typically brown in color with white tips. A pronounced hump appears on their shoulders; the hump is a good way to distinguish a black bear from a grizzly bear, as black bears do not have this hump.

Diet

Brown bears on the Alaskan Peninsula usually feed on spawning salmon, and use many different ways to catch them. These include waiting at the bottom of the falls for the fish to jump, or standing at the top of the falls waiting to catch the fish in midair (sometimes in their mouths). Bears also have much experience at chasing fish around and pinning the slippery animals with their claws. After the salmon runs, berries and grass make the mainstay of the bears' diets, after which they put on sufficient fat reserves and go into hibernation.

References

Grizzly bears
Fauna of Alaska
Endemic fauna of the United States
Endemic fauna of Alaska
Arctic land animals
Carnivorans of North America
Mammals of the Arctic
Mammals of the United States
Least concern biota of the United States
Extant Late Pleistocene first appearances